Sjeverin is a village in the Raška (Sandžak) area of Serbia, located in the municipality of Priboj, in the district of Zlatibor, close to the border with Bosnia. In 2002 it had a population of 337, the majority Serbs.

In October 1992, during the Bosnian war, 16 Bosniak residents of Sjeverin were abducted and murdered by Milan Lukić and members of  Osvetnici ("Avengers") paramilitary group in the Sjeverin massacre.  Following the massacre other Bosniaks fled the area.  In 2006 the Sandžak Committee for Protection of Human Rights and Freedoms reported that the state was not working to facilitate the return of the population displaced by ethnic cleansing.

Population:
1948: 240 / 1953: 253 / 1961: 304 / 1971: 360 / 1981: 424 / 1991: 572 / 2002: 337

Ethnic composition of the population (1981):
Serbs: 169 (39,86%); Muslims: 231 (54,48%); Yugoslavs: 22 (5.19%); Unknown/Other:

Ethnic composition of the population (2002):
Serbs: 244 (72.40%); Bosniaks: 63 (18.69%); Muslims: 25 (7.41%); Montenegrins: 1 (0.29%); Unknown/Other:

References 

Villages in Serbia
Populated places in Zlatibor District